Pimpernel and Rosemary is a novel by Baroness Emmuska Orczy, originally published in 1924. It is set after the First World War and features Peter Blakeney, a descendant of the Scarlet Pimpernel (Percy Blakeney).

The action is mainly set amongst the disaffected Hungarian nobility in Transylvania, allowing Orczy to draw on her knowledge of Hungarian history and politics.

External links 
 
 

1924 British novels
Scarlet Pimpernel books
Novels by Baroness Emma Orczy
Fiction set in 1922
Cassell (publisher) books